The Best Music Supervision for Films Budgeted Under $10 Million award is annually given by the Guild of Music Supervisors to honor the best music supervision in a film with a budget over 20 million dollars. It was first given at their fourth annual awards function, and has continued to be ever since, except for 2015, when the award was not given.

Winners and nominees

2010s

References

American film awards
Film awards for Best Music Director